Gastrocopta servilis is a species of gastropods belonging to the family Gastrocoptidae.

The species is found in Southern Hemisphere.

References

Gastrocoptidae